Trizer Dale Dajuya Mansueto, is a Filipino historian. He is a graduate of B.A. History and obtained his Master of Arts in History from Silliman University, Dumaguete, Philippines. An author of several books, he is also involved in museums, translation and teaching. He contributes stories to Cebu Daily News and the Philippine Daily Inquirer (both under the Inquirer Group).

He helped organize the Carcar City Museum in Carcar, Cebu,and the Cathedral Museum of Cebu, an ecclesiastical museum in 2006. He is also co-author of the books Balaanong Bahandi: Sacred Treasures of the Archdiocese of Cebu and Via Veritatis: The Life and Ministry of Ricardo Cardinal Vidal.

In the field of translation, he is co-translator in English of Hunger in Nayawak together with Hope Sabanpan-Yu and translator in Cebuano of I See Cebu. His latest translation in Cebuano is a biography, Pedro Calungsod: Patron sa Kabatan-unang Pilipino originally written in English by Fr. Salvador G. Agualada, CMF.

Mansueto acted as researcher and was later commissioned to write The History of Danao City of the Cebu Provincial History Project contracted by the Province of Cebu which is still to be released. He lives in Bantayan, Cebu.

References

21st-century Filipino historians
Living people
People from Cebu
Silliman University alumni
Year of birth missing (living people)